Michele M. Wucker /’wʊkər/ (born 1969) is an American author, commentator and policy analyst specializing in the world economy and crisis anticipation. She is the author of The Gray Rhino: How to Recognize and Act on the Obvious Dangers We Ignore, Lockout: Why America Keeps Getting Immigration Wrong when Our Prosperity Depends on Getting it Right and Why the Cocks Fight: Dominicans, Haitians and the Struggle for Hispaniola.

Biography 
Wucker is of American, Belgian and Austrian Slavic descent, and lives in Chicago, Illinois.

She holds a B.A. in French and Policy Studies from Rice University and a Master of International Affairs and Certificate in Latin American Studies from the School of International and Public Affairs at Columbia University. In 2012, she received a Certificate in Global Leadership and Public Policy in the 21st Century from the John F. Kennedy School of Government at Harvard University.

She worked as a news reporter at the Milwaukee Sentinel (now the Milwaukee Journal-Sentinel) in 1990, covering the local Hispanic community.  She wrote about emerging markets finance at Dow Jones, AmericaEconomia, and International Financing Review. From 2000–2001, she was Latin America Bureau Chief for International Financing Review and editor of IFR Latin America.

After publishing Why the Cocks Fight, she was appointed senior fellow at the World Policy Institute, at the time part of The New School, in New York City.

She was part of the Brookings-Duke Immigration Roundtable, which issued its recommendations in 2009. She was also part of the SUNY-Levin Institute New York in the World Advisory Council, which issued its recommendations in 2011 to New York City and State on policy responses to economic globalization.

In August 2014, Wucker left the World Policy Institute to join the Chicago Council on Global Affairs as Vice President for Studies. In 2015, she left that organization and founded Gray Rhino & Company.

Awards 
In 2007, she was awarded a  Guggenheim Fellowship for her work on changing global conceptions of citizenship. In 2008, she became a Women's Media Center Progressive Women's Voices Alumna. In 2009, the World Economic Forum honored her as a Young Global Leader. In 2010, the Women's Media Center named Wucker a Woman Making History for her work on immigration and the relationship between the Dominican Republic and Haiti.

Key concepts

Gray rhinos  
Wucker introduced the term "gray rhino" at the World Economic Forum Annual Meeting in Davos, Switzerland in January 2013. Unlike highly improbable "black swans" popularized by Nassim Nicholas Taleb’s 2007 book, gray rhinos are highly probable, high impact yet neglected threats.  The concept is developed further in her 2016 book, The Gray Rhino: How to Recognize and Act on the Obvious Dangers We Ignore.

The Chinese government embraced the term in a front-page editorial in the official newspaper, People's Daily, on July 17, 2017. Coming right after the important National Financial Work Conference strategy session, which occurs every five years, the official use of the "gray rhino" concept was interpreted widely as signaling a concerted effort to tighten regulation and reduce financial risk. In response, investors sold stocks perceived as risky, sending the Shenzhen small-cap stock index down 4.3% and the ChiNext tech index down 5.1%.

The New York Times referenced gray rhinos and China's policy shift in a front-page article on July 23, 2017.

The book has been translated into Hungarian, Chinese and Korean.

Sovereign debt crisis 
Months before Argentina’s 2001 default, Wucker sounded an alarm that the lack of a process like an international Chapter 11 for sovereign defaults would increase the likelihood and costs of larger financial crises. In 2011, she made an early case for a preemptive restructuring and write-down of Greek sovereign debt.

United States immigration policy 
In her second book, Lockout: Why America Keeps Getting Immigration Wrong When Our Prosperity Depends on Getting It Right, Wucker details the economic impact of the breakdown of the US visa bureaucracy after 9/11. She flags the widespread American misconception that earlier generations of immigrants were more likely to stay than more recent arrivals, and warns that the United States is failing to capitalize on its greatest strength. Some of her policy recommendations have been controversial, such as a 2007 New York Times op-ed that proposed reducing family preference visas for adult siblings of US citizens in return for increases in employment-related visas. Despite writing on controversial issues, she has been recognized for making her case "clearly and deliberately" and for a voice that is "wise and reasonable" and "ethical".

Variability of citizenship 
Wucker was an early commentator on the economic impact of migrant worker remittances and drew attention to the ways in which countries were changing their conceptions of citizenship and political power to attract the funds workers sent home to their families. She has challenged traditional ways of thinking about citizenship, arguing that dual citizenship and other expanded definitions benefit both sending countries and host countries. Wucker has argued that non-citizen voting, also known as resident voting or municipal voting because it is limited to residents of cities in city elections, prepares people for US citizenship and helps their communities.

Dominican-Haitian relations 
The New York Times Book Review described Wucker’s 1999 book, Why the Cocks Fight: Dominicans, Haitians, and the Struggle for Hispaniola, as "a complex exploration of the cultural divide between Haiti and the Dominican Republic." The book addresses historical, economic, political and social dimensions of the relationship between the two countries sharing the island of Hispaniola, viewing conflicts over culture as the symptoms rather than the root cause of the tensions. She is a recognized expert on the topic.

Selected bibliography

Books 
Why the Cocks Fight: Dominicans, Haitians, and the Struggle for Hispaniola (Hill & Wang, 1999/2000) ; 
Lockout: Why America Keeps Getting Immigration Wrong When Our Prosperity Depends on Getting It Right (PublicAffairs Press, 2006/2007)

References

External links 
 www.wucker.com – official website
Michele Wucker on Twitter
Michele Wucker’s SheSource Profile
Michele Wucker appearances on C-Span

1969 births
Columbia University faculty
International relations scholars
Living people
American people of Slavic descent
Writers about globalization
American people of Belgian descent
Rice University alumni
School of International and Public Affairs, Columbia University alumni
Women political writers
American political writers
Belgian political writers
American women non-fiction writers
American women academics
21st-century American women